Paolo Bellino (born 19 August 1969) is an Italian male retired hurdler who participated at the 1991 World Championships in Athletics.

Achievements

References

External links

1969 births
Italian male hurdlers
World Athletics Championships athletes for Italy
Living people
Athletics competitors of Fiamme Oro